Neosilurus gloveri, commonly known as Dalhousie catfish, is a species of catfish native to Dalhousie Springs in central Australia.

References

gloveri
Freshwater fish of South Australia
Venomous fish
Fish described in 1998